Sue Grimmond is a New Zealand scientist and professor of urban meteorology at the University of Reading. She currently holds the post of Met Office Joint Chair. Grimmond is a pioneer of the fields of urban meteorology and micrometerology, which deal with the atmospheric boundary layer.

Education and early career 
Grimmond completed her BSc in physical geography at the University of Otago, Dunedin, New Zealand in 1980. In 1984, she obtained an MSc in physical geography, specialising in climatology and hydrology, from the University of British Columbia, Vancouver, Canada. She completed her PhD on evapotranspiration of urban areas at the University of British Columbia in 1989.

In 1989, Grimmond took up an assistant professor post at Indiana University, USA, where she maintains an adjunct professor position. In 2006 she was appointed professor and chair of physical geography in the Environmental Monitoring & Modelling Group of King's College London, UK. In 2013 she took up the post of professor of urban meteorology at the University of Reading.

Grimmond has undertaken visiting scientist positions at Shanghai Institute of Meteorological Sciences (China), the  CSIRO Centre for Marine & Atmospheric Research (Australia), Göteborg University (Sweden), University of Tokyo (Japan) and Monash University (Australia).

Research interests 
Grimmond has contributed to wide range of topics within boundary layer and urban meteorology, publishing around 240 papers which have attracted approximately 26,000 citations, generating a h-index of 85. She has been particularly influential in understanding the effects of urbanisation on climate and the representation of urban environments within climate and weather simulations.

Awards and honours 
2020 Symons Gold Medal, Royal Meteorological Society

2013 Chair of the World Meteorological Organization Expert Team on Urban and Building Climatology

2012 Ernest Frolich Fellowship, CSIRO Marine and Atmospheric Sciences, Australia

2009 Luke Howard Award for outstanding contributions to the field of urban climatology, International Association for Urban Climate

2009 Helmut E Landsberg Award, American Meteorological Society for "contributions that have greatly advanced urban meteorology & urban climate sciences, and for sustained & effective leadership that has energized the urban climate research community"

2008 Universitatis Lodziensis Amico Medal, University of Łódź, Poland

2006 Doctor of Science Honoris Causa, Göteborg University, Sweden

2006 Elected a Fellow of the American Meteorological Society

2003-2007 President of the International Association for Urban Climate

2001-2014 Associate editor of the Journal of Applied Meteorology & Climatology

References 

Year of birth missing (living people)
Living people
New Zealand women scientists
New Zealand meteorologists
Women meteorologists
20th-century New Zealand scientists
20th-century women scientists
21st-century New Zealand scientists
21st-century women scientists
University of Otago alumni
University of British Columbia alumni
Indiana University faculty
Academics of King's College London
Academics of the University of Reading